Something Broadway, Something Latin is an album by June Christy that was released in 1965 on Capitol as ST-2410. A bonus track was added to the CD. In 2009 the album was reissued as a double-CD with Jeri Southern's 1959 album Jeri Southern Meets Cole Porter.

Track listing
 "Do I Hear a Waltz?" (Richard Rodgers, Stephen Sondheim) - 2:18
 "Long Ago" (David Heneker) - 2:23
 "Come Back to Me" (Burton Lane, Alan Jay Lerner) - 2:00
 "Here's That Rainy Day" (Jimmy Van Heusen, Johnny Burke) - 2:36
 "He Touched Me" (Milton Schafer, Ira Levin) - 2:34
 "The Shadow of Your Smile (Love Theme from The Sandpiper)" (Johnny Mandel, Paul Francis Webster) - 2:56
 "Gimme Some" (Charles Strouse, Lee Adams) - 2:07
 "What Did I Have That I Don't Have?" (Lane, Lerner)
 "Run for Your Life!" (Van Heusen, Sammy Cahn)
 "Tell Me More" (Morton Jacobs, Dok Stanford)
 "Cast Your Fate to the Wind" (Vince Guaraldi, Carel Werber)

Bonus track 
 "One Note Samba (Samba de Uma Nota So)" (Antônio Carlos Jobim, Newton Mendonça)

Personnel
 June Christy – vocals
 Ernie Freeman – piano, arranger, conductor
Tracks 1, 4, 7, 10
 Tom Shepard – trombone
 Lew McCreary – trombone
 Lou Blackburn – trombone
 Kenny Shroyer – bass trombone
 Wilbur Schwartz – reeds
 Bob Cooper – reeds
 William Green – reeds
 Ray Sherman – piano
 John Gray – guitar
 Al Viola – guitar
 Bill Pitman – guitar
 Red Callender – bass
 Hal Blaine – drums
 Emil Richards – percussion, vibraphone
Recorded Capitol Tower, Hollywood 20 May 1965

Tracks 3, 8, 9, 11
 Lew McCreary – trombone
 Bob Enevoldsen – trombone
 Dave Wells – trombone
 Kenny Shroyer – bass trombone
 Bud Shank – alto saxophone, flute
 Ronnie Lang – reeds
 Bob Cooper – reeds
 Gene Cipriano – reeds
 Gene Garf – piano
 Louis Morell – guitar
 John Gray – guitar
 Al McKibbon – bass
 Earl Palmer – drums
 Julius Wechter – mallets, bongo drums, tympani
Recorded Capitol Tower, Hollywood 31 August 1965

Tracks 2, 5, 6
 Bud Shank – alto saxophone, flute
 Gene Garf – piano
 Al Viola – guitar
 Louis Morell – guitar
 Red Callender – bass
 Hal Blaine – drums
 Emil Richards – percussion, vibraphone
Recorded Capitol Tower, Hollywood 3 September 1965

Track  12
 June Christy – vocal
 Bob Cooper's Orchestra
 Bob Cooper – arranger, conductor
 Dan Lube, Erno Neufeld, Lou Raderman, Sam Freed, Felix Slatkin, George Kast, Bob Barene, Nathan Kaproff – strings
 Ronnie Lang – flute
 Emil Richards – vibraphone
 Laurindo Almeida – guitar
 Joe Mondragon – bass
 Shelly Manne – drums
 Milt Holland – percussion
Recorded Capitol Tower, Hollywood, 4 October 1962

June Christy albums
1965 albums
Capitol Records albums
Albums arranged by Ernie Freeman
Albums conducted by Ernie Freeman